Dargeçit District is a district of the Mardin Province of Turkey. The seat of the district is the town of Dargeçit and the population was 27,307 in 2021.

Status 
The district was established in 1987.

With the administrative reform in 2012, Dargeçit District contains forty-one neighborhoods of which four form the town of Dargeçit. Prior to the reform, the district comprised the main town of Dargeçit, two beldes, thirty-six villages and twenty-six hamlets.

Settlements

Center neighborhoods 

 Bahçebaşı
 Safa
 Saray
 Tepebaşı

Rural neighborhoods 

 Akçaköy
 Akyol
 Alayunt
 Altınoluk
 Altıyol
 Bağözü
 Batur
 Baysun
 Beğendi
 Belen
 Bostanlı
 Çatalan
 Çatalçam
 Çavuşlu
 Çelikköy
 Çukurdede
 Değerli
 Gürgen
 Gürışık
 Ilısu
 Karabayır
 Kartalkaya
 Kılavuz
 Kısmetli
 Korucu
 Kumdere
 Kuşluca
 Ormaniçi
 Suçatı
 Sümer
 Tanyeri
 Tavşanlı
 Temelli
 Ulaş
 Yanılmaz
 Yılmaz
 Yoncalı

References 

Districts of Mardin Province